Coava Coffee Roasters is a coffee roaster based in Portland, Oregon.

History
Matt Higgins started the company in 2008. In 2018, he was named Oregon's small business person of the year.

The company opened its fourth location in downtown Portland in 2017. Another location opened in San Diego in 2017.

The business was featured on Comedians in Cars Getting Coffee. In the episode, Jerry Seinfeld took Fred Armisen to Coava's flagship location in Portland, Oregon.

References

External links

 
 

American companies established in 2008
Coffee brands
Coffee in Portland, Oregon
Food and drink companies based in Portland, Oregon